Burtinus is a genus of broad-headed bugs in the family Alydidae. There are at least two described species in Burtinus.

Species
These two species belong to the genus Burtinus:
 Burtinus luteomarginatus Maldonado Capriles, 1953
 Burtinus notatipennis Stål, 1859

References

Further reading

 

Articles created by Qbugbot
Alydinae
Pentatomomorpha genera